During the 1993–94 English football season, Sunderland A.F.C. competed in the Football League First Division.

Season summary
A poor first half of the 1993–94 season resulted in Terry Butcher being sacked with the Black Cats in the relegation zone and Mick Buxton was appointed as his successor. A tightening of the team's defence led to an improvement in results and Sunderland finished the season in 12th place.

Final league table

Results
Sunderland's score comes first

Legend

Football League First Division

FA Cup

League Cup

Anglo-Italian Cup

Players

First-team squad
Squad at end of season

References

Notes

Sunderland A.F.C. seasons
Sunderland